Uno Åhrén (6 August 1897 – 8 October 1977) was a Swedish architect and city planner, and a leading proponent of functionalism in Sweden.

Biography
Uno Emrik Åhrén was born  in Stockholm, Sweden. He graduated as an architect at the KTH Royal Institute of Technology in Stockholm in 1918. 
He was City Planning Manager in Gothenburg 1932-1943 and head of the Riksbyggen 1943-1945. He was appointed professor of urban construction at the Royal Institute of Technology from 1947 through 1963.

In 1930 Åhrén was one of the designers for the Housing Exhibition of the Stockholm International Exhibition, and in 1931 he was one of the six co-authors of the  1931 manifesto, Acceptera, a plea for acceptance of functionalism, standardization, and mass production as a cultural change in Sweden.

Åhrén collaborated with the sociologist, reformer and Nobel Memorial Prize in Economic Sciences winner Gunnar Myrdal from 1932 though 1935 on a social housing commission, and in 1934 they co-authored The Housing Question as a Social Planning Problem, a work that would prove influential in the structuring of the Swedish Social Democratic Party, the Folkhemmet.  In fact Prime Minister Per Albin Hansson, who coined the word Folkhemmet, himself moved into an Åhrén-designed functionalist house in 1936.

Åhrén died at Arvika during 1977.

Work 
 Student Union at the Royal Institute of Technology, Stockholm, 1928-1930, with Sven Markelius
 Ford Motor Company, Stockholm, 1930–31
 Flamman Soundfilm Theatre, Hornstull, Stockholm, 1930
 Terrace houses in Norra Ängby, Bromma, Stockholm, 1931–40
 Chief City Planner for Gothenburg, 1932–1943
 Årsta centrum, Stockholm 1943–53
 Chief for the housing cooperative Riksbyggen 1943–1945

See also
Social engineering (political science)

References

1897 births
1977 deaths
Swedish architects
Congrès International d'Architecture Moderne members
KTH Royal Institute of Technology alumni
Academic staff of the KTH Royal Institute of Technology
Swedish urban planners
Housing reformers
Housing in Sweden
Modernist architects from Sweden